Tukaram Ramkrishna Kate is a member of the 13th Maharashtra Legislative Assembly. He represents the Anushakti Nagar Constituency, Mumbai. He belongs to the Shiv Sena.

Positions held
 2014: Elected to Maharashtra Legislative Assembly

See also
 Mumbai South Central Lok Sabha constituency

References

External links
 Shiv Sena Official website

Maharashtra MLAs 2014–2019
Shiv Sena politicians
Living people
People from Mumbai Suburban district
Marathi politicians
Year of birth missing (living people)